Abellio is a Celtic god.

Abellio may also refer to:
 Abellio (transport company) - Bus and rail operator in Europe
 Abellio Deutschland - German arm of Abellio
 Abellio (London & Surrey) - Abellio's bus operations in the UK
 Serco-Abellio - a UK rail operator (jointly with Serco)
 Raymond Abellio, a French writer
 Abellio, a layer within the Arcadia (Dungeons & Dragons) Open Plane